Cissy Jones is an American voice actress.

Jones's voice has appeared in games such as Firewatch, The Walking Dead, Life Is Strange, Grand Theft Auto V and  Darksiders III. She voiced the part of Lois Lane in the 2018 game Lego DC Super-Villains.

After some years in white-collar work, Jones began her voice acting career in 2011 after meeting writer Sean Vanaman and starring as Katjaa in The Walking Dead. Vanaman kept in touch with Jones and offered her work when Campo Santo needed voices for characters. Her dialogue for the part of Delilah in Firewatch took two years to record. At the 13th British Academy Games Awards in 2017, she received a BAFTA Games Award in the Performer category for her work on the game.

Filmography

References

External links
 
 
 
 

Living people
American video game actresses
American voice actresses
BAFTA winners (people)
Place of birth missing (living people)
Year of birth missing (living people)
21st-century American women